
Gmina Wisznia Mała is a rural gmina (administrative district) in Trzebnica County, Lower Silesian Voivodeship, in south-western Poland. Its seat is the village of Wisznia Mała. It is part of the Wrocław metropolitan area.

Neighbouring gminas
Gmina Wisznia Mała is bordered by the town of Wrocław and the gminas of Długołęka, Oborniki Śląskie and Trzebnica.

Villages
The gmina contains the villages of Gaj, Kryniczno, Krzyżanowice, Ligota Piękna, Machnice, Malin, Mienice, Ozorowice, Pierwoszów, Piotrkowiczki, Psary, Rogoż, Strzeszów, Szewce, Szymanów, Wisznia Mała and Wysoki Kościół.

References

Wisznia Mala
Trzebnica County